= Aphonopelma rubropilosum =

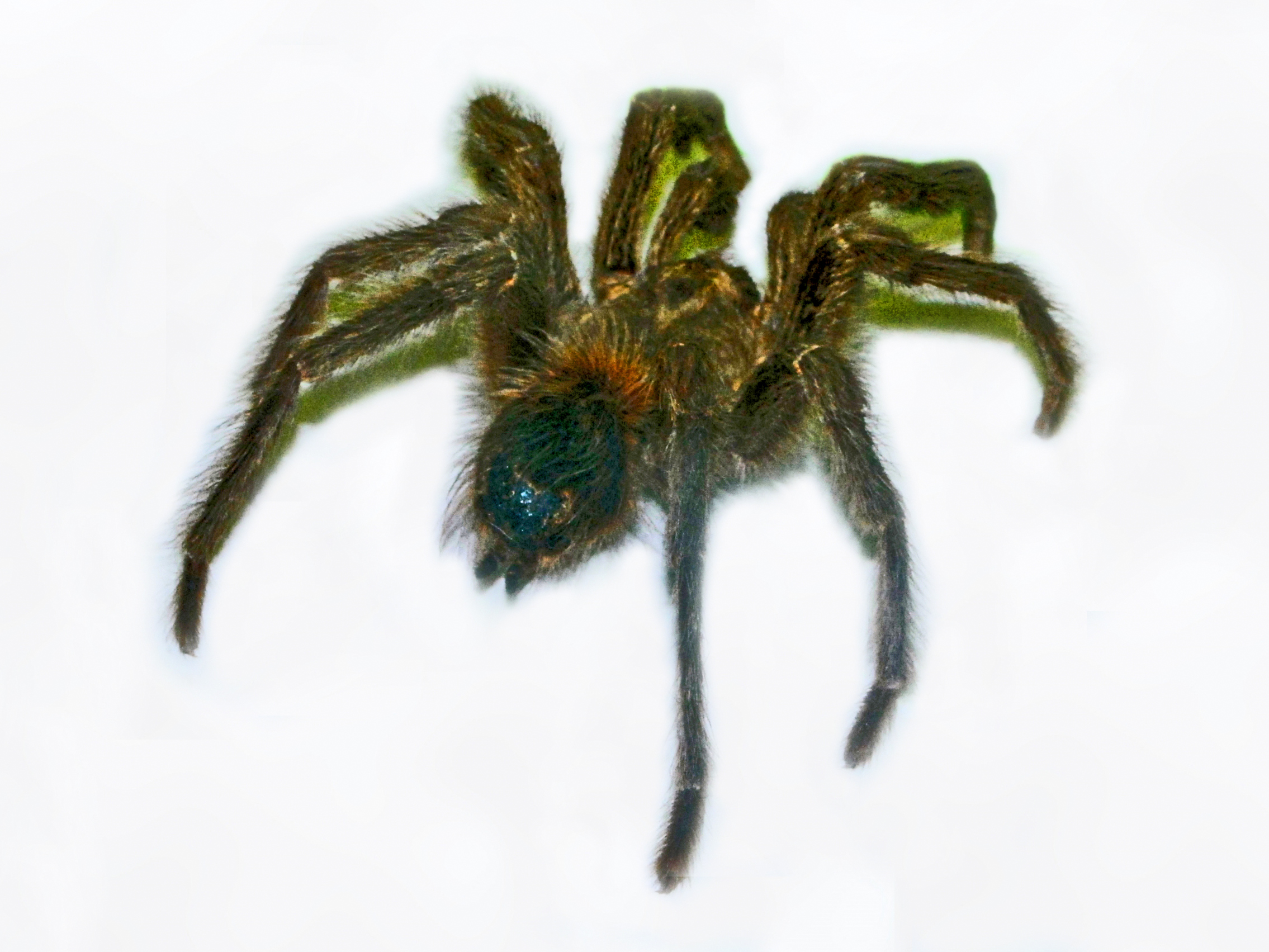

Aphonopelma rubropilosum (Ausserer, 1871) is now regarded as a nomen dubium (doubtful name). It was previously considered to be a species of spider from Brazil belonging to the family Theraphosidae.
